Victoria Coach Station in the City of Westminster is the largest coach station in London, and a terminus for medium and long distance coach services in the United Kingdom. It is operated by Victoria Coach Station Limited, a subsidiary of Transport for London. , there were 14 million passenger and 472,000 coach movements annually.

The departure building includes food and retail outlets, left-luggage facilities and a ticket hall.

London Buses routes 11, 44, 170, 211, C1, C10, N11 and N44 serve the coach station. It is a short walk from Victoria railway station.

History

Victoria Coach Station was commissioned by London Coastal Coaches, a consortium of coach operators, and opened on 10 March 1932 by Minister of Transport John Pybus. Wallis, Gilbert and Partners' distinctive Art Deco building was originally built with spaces for 76 coaches, and a booking hall, shops, buffet, restaurant, lounge and bar. London Coastal Coaches' headquarters and other offices occupied upper floors.

During World War II coach travel was restricted and the War Office  requisitioned the premises.

By the 1960s, operation of the station had passed through industry consolidation to Tilling Group and British Electric Traction, whence it was reorganised by the Transport Act 1968 to become part of National Bus Company. Subsequently it was transferred to London Transport in 1988, and Transport for London in 2000.

Freehold owner, Grosvenor Group, announced in 2013 that it wished to redevelop the site and relocate station operations elsewhere in London, though the following year English Heritage designated the building Grade II listed. Nevertheless, several of Transport for London's leases on the station were due to expire by 2023 and proposals were made to relocate to Royal Oak, but in 2019 the move was abandoned.

Utilisation

Use of the coach station has increased from 2008 to 2018.

Operators

, service operators include:-

Financial

Profits for Transport for London subsidiary, Victoria Coach Station Ltd have increased over recent years.

Controversy 

In 2019, Transport for London was served a Fire Enforcement Notice after a "catalogue of major fire risks" were found by London Fire Brigade inspectors at Victoria Coach Station.

The deficiencies included holes in walls, which could cause a fire to spread; inadequate fire sprinkler systems that had been broken and out of use for more than two years, and obstructed exit routes used for storage. Fire experts described the situation as  a "walking disaster area" and "by far the worst I've seen in a long time". Transport for London posted fire watchers.

References

External links 

 

Art Deco architecture in London
Bus stations in London
Former nationalised industries of the United Kingdom
Transport in the City of Westminster
Grade II listed buildings in the City of Westminster
Transport for London
Victoria, London